Ponugupadu is a village in Phirangipuram Mandal, Guntur district, Andhra Pradesh, India. The village is 12 km from Narasaraopet and 3 km from Sathuluru Railway Station ( on Guntur – Narsaraopet Line).

Demographics 

The village is home to 4356 people, among them 2213 (51%) are male and 2143 (49%) are female. 59% of the whole population are from general caste, 39% are from schedule caste and 3% are schedule tribes. Child (aged under 6 years) population of Ponugupadu village is 10%, among them 56% are boys and 44% are girls. There are 1217 households in the village and an average 4 persons live in every family.

Growth of population 
Population of the village has increased by 3.5% in last 10 years. In 2001 census total population here were 4209. Female population growth rate of the village is 3.8% which is 0.6% higher than male population growth rate of 3.2%. General caste population has decreased by −2.4%; Schedule caste population has increased by 14.1%; Schedule Tribe population has increased by 2.7% and child population has decreased by −11.9% in the village since last census.

Sex Ratio – Females per 1000 Male 
As of 2011 census there are 968 females per 1000 male in the village. Sex ratio in general caste is 986, in schedule caste is 944 and in schedule tribe is 933. There are 777 girls under 6 years of age per 1000 boys of the same age in the village. Overall sex ratio in the village has increased by 6 females per 1000 male during the years from 2001 to 2011. Child sex ratio here has decreased by 81 girls per 1000 boys during the same time.

Change in sex ratio 2001 to 2011 – Ponugupadu

Literacy 
Total 2442 people in the village are literate, among them 1383 are male and 1059 are female. Literacy rate (children under 6 are excluded) of Ponugupadu is 62%. 70% of male and 54% of female population are literate here. Overall literacy rate in the village has increased by 5%. Male literacy has gone up by 4% and female literacy rate has gone up by 7%.

Change in literacy rate 2001 to 2011 – Ponugupadu

Workers profile 
Ponugupadu has 58% (2534) population engaged in either main or marginal works. 61% male and 55% female population are working population. 59% of total male population are main (full time) workers and 2% are marginal (part time) workers. For women 50% of total female population are main and 4% are marginal workers.

Percentage of working population – Ponugupadu

References

External links 
 http://www.manaponugupadu.com

Villages in Guntur district